Lucie Visser (born 18 February 1958 in The Hague) is a Dutch former model and actress who was elected Miss Netherlands in 1976.

Visser's career began aged 15 when she participated in an election for finest European Model in Capri. She finished third, where she came into contact with the renowned photographer David Hamilton, who took her to Saint-Tropez. Visser's breakthrough came on May 14, 1976, in Zandvoort where she won the Miss Netherlands title. A month later, in the elections for Miss Europe held in Rhodes, she came third again, but decided not to take part in the international contests that year. The runner-up, Nanny Nielen, took her place.

As a result of her fame as a model, Visser played a number of film roles. In June 1987 and December 1989 she posed in the Dutch edition of Playboy.

Filmography

References 
This article incorporates information from the equivalent article on the Dutch Wikipedia.

External links 
 

1958 births
Living people
Actresses from The Hague
Dutch female models